John O'Keefe (11 January 1880 – 27 January 1942) was an Australian politician. He was a Labor member of the Legislative Assembly of Queensland, representing Chillagoe from 1926 to 1929 and Cairns from 1930 to 1942. He was Attorney-General from 1940 to 1941.

O'Keefe died in office in 1942 and following his funeral at St Stephen's Cathedral was buried in Nudgee Cemetery.

References

1880 births
1942 deaths
Members of the Queensland Legislative Assembly
Burials at Nudgee Cemetery
Attorneys-General of Queensland
Australian Labor Party members of the Parliament of Queensland
20th-century Australian politicians